The Libyan News Agency, also known as LANA, is the official state news agency of State Of Libya.

It was founded in 1964 as the Libyan News Agency by a royal decree, amended in 1970 after the 1969 coup d'état and fall of the Kingdom of Libya and changed its name to Al-Jamaherya News Agency (JANA). It was taken off the air during the Battle of Tripoli in August 2011, as rebel forces overran the capital.

Under Muammar Gaddafi's government, the agency was the only authorised distributor of foreign news and most domestic news in the country. It also routinely reported on Gaddafi and his family.

The Libyan News Agency (LANA) had a number of agreements with Arab, African and international news agencies. It had over 300 staff and 10 overseas bureaus in London, Rome, Paris, Valletta, Tunis, Cairo, Rabat and Damascus. The agency also maintained domestic offices and correspondents in provincial councils linked to the head office in Tripoli.

See also
 Mathaba News Agency
 Media of Libya
 Communications in Libya

References

External links  
 Jamahiriya News Agency official website
 Archive of JANA site 

News agencies based in Libya
Mass media in Tripoli, Libya
Mass media companies established in 1964
1964 establishments in Libya